Lim Xiaoqing (born 15 August 1967 as Sun Xiaoqing) is a retired badminton player originally from China who later represented Sweden. She won five European Badminton Championships, one in women's singles in 1994, two in women's doubles and mixed team events in 1992 and 1994 respectively. She captured the women's singles titles at the prestigious 1995 All England Open, defeating Denmark's Camilla Martin in the final. She ranked as women's singles World number 1 in March 1995.

Lim is married to retired Swedish badminton player Thomas Kihlström.

Achievements

World Championships 
Women's doubles

World Cup 
Women's singles

Women's doubles

European Championships 
Women's singles

Women's doubles

IBF World Grand Prix 
The World Badminton Grand Prix was sanctioned by the International Badminton Federation from 1983 to 2006.

Women's singles

Women's doubles

IBF International 
Women's singles

Women's doubles

Mixed doubles

Nordic Championships 
Women's singles

Women's doubles

Invitational tournament 
Women's doubles

References 

1967 births
Living people
Badminton players from Fujian
Chinese female badminton players
Chinese emigrants to Sweden
Swedish female badminton players
World No. 1 badminton players